Chadwick Beach Island is an unincorporated community along the Jersey Shore located in Toms River, in Ocean County, New Jersey, United States, next to Barnegat Bay on a barrier island.

References

Geography of Ocean County, New Jersey
Jersey Shore communities in Ocean County
Toms River, New Jersey
Unincorporated communities in Ocean County, New Jersey
Unincorporated communities in New Jersey